Khanegeh (also Romanized as Khānegeh and Khānekeh) is a village in Tarhan-e Gharbi Rural District, Tarhan District, Kuhdasht County, Lorestan Province, Iran. At the 2006 census, its population was 106, in 22 families.

References 

Towns and villages in Kuhdasht County